Honest Workers is the fifth studio album by The Kelly Family, released in 1991.

Track listing

References

The Kelly Family albums
1991 albums